The following is a list of compositions by Tobias Picker. For a description of these works, see the associated pages and the Tobias Picker page.

Tobias Picker's music is published exclusively by Schott Music Corporation.

Stage works

Operas 
 Emmeline (1996, commissioned by the Santa Fe Opera, premiered July 27, 1996, libretto by J.D. McClatchy, based on the novel by Judith Rossner)
 Fantastic Mr. Fox (1998, commissioned by the Roald Dahl Foundation, premiered December 9, 1998, libretto by Donald Sturrock, based on the book by Roald Dahl)
 Thérèse Raquin (1999/2000, commissioned by the Dallas Opera, premiered November 30, 2001, libretto by Gene Scheer, based on the novel by Émile Zola)
 An American Tragedy (2005/2006, commissioned by the Metropolitan Opera, premiered December 2, 2005, libretto by Gene Scheer, based on the novel by Theodore Dreiser)
  Dolores Claiborne (premiered September 18, 2013 by the San Francisco Opera, libretto by J.D. McClatchy, based on the novel by Stephen King)

Ballets 
 Awakenings (2010, premiered September 22, 2010, libretto by Oliver Sacks after his book)

Works for large ensemble

Symphonies 
 Symphony No. 1 in two movements (1982, premiered 1983)
 Symphony No. 2 Aussöhnung for soprano and orchestra (1986)
 Symphony No. 3 for string orchestra, (1988, premiered 1989, after his String Quartet and Bass (1988), see Chamber music)

Other works for orchestra 
 The Blue Hula for chamber ensemble (1981)
 The Encantadas for narrator and orchestra (1983, see also Works for voice and orchestra)
 Old and Lost Rivers for orchestra (1986)
 The Encantadas for narrator and chamber orchestra (1986, from his work for narrator and orchestra The Encantadas (1983), see Works for voice and orchestra)
 Séance: Hommage à Sibelius for orchestra (1991)
 Two Fantasies for orchestra (1989, premiered 1990)
 And Suddenly It's Evening for orchestra and solo violin concert master (1994)
 Opera Without Words for orchestra (2016)

Works for wind ensemble 
 Dedication Anthem for wind ensemble (1984)

Concerti, solo instruments and orchestra 
 Piano Concerto No. 1 (1980)
 Violin Concerto (1981)
 Keys to the City (Piano Concerto No. 2) (1983)
 Piano Concerto No. 3: Kilauea (1986)
 Romances and Interludes for oboe and orchestra (1989, Romances are orchestrations of Robert Schumann's Op. 94)
 Bang! for amplified piano and orchestra (1992)
 Viola Concerto (1994)
 Concerto for cello and orchestra (1999)

Works for piano

Solo piano 
 When Soft Voices Die (1977)
 Old and Lost Rivers (1986)
 The Blue Hula (1990)
 Three Pieces (1990)
 Four Etudes for Ursula (1996)
 Three Nocturnes (2009)

Works for two pianos 
 Pianorama for two pianos (1984)

Chamber music 
 Septet for flute, bassoon, trumpet, trombone, piano, violin, and percussion (1975)
 Sextet No. 2 for oboe, clarinet, violin, cello, piano, and percussion (1976)
 Sextet No. 3 for flute, violin, cello, bass, piano, and percussion (1977)
 Rhapsody for violin and piano (1978)
 Romance for violin and piano (1979)
 Nova for violin, viola, cello, bass, and piano (1979, composed as a companion piece to the "Trout" quintet)
 Octet for oboe, bass clarinet, horn, harp, violin, cello, bass, and percussion (1979)
 The Blue Hula for flute, clarinet, violin, cello, piano, and percussion (1981)
 Serenade for piano and wind quintet (1983)
 String Quartet No. 1: New Memories (1987)
 Keys to the City chamber version for solo piano, oboe, clarinet, bassoon, and strings (1987)
 String Quartet and Bass (1988)
 Invisible Lilacs for violin and piano (1991)
 Suite for cello and piano (1998)
 String Quartet No. 2 (2008)
 Piano Quintet: "Live Oaks" (2011)

Vocal works 
 Aussöhnung for medium or high voice and piano (1984, text by Goethe)
 When We Meet Again (Sonnet) for medium or high voice and piano (1985, text by Edna St. Vincent Millay)
 Half a Year Together for medium or high voice and piano (1987, text by Richard Howard)
 Remembering for medium or high voice and piano (1987, text by Edna St. Vincent Millay)
 Two Songs (from The Rain in the Trees) for medium or high voice and piano (1992, text by W.S. Merwin)
 Not Even the Rain for medium or high voice and piano (1999, text by e.e. cummings)
 Irrational Exuberance for medium-high to high voice and piano (2001, text by Gene Scheer)
 Tres Sonetos de Amor for medium or high voice and piano (2000, three sonnets by Pablo Neruda)
 I Am In Need of Music for medium or high voice and piano (2004, text by Elizabeth Bishop)
 Amo el trozo de tierra for medium or high voice and piano (2005, text by Pablo Neruda)
 Choruses of the Trees for four-part children's choir (2009, text by Roald Dahl)

Works for voice and orchestra 
 The Encantadas for narrator and orchestra (1983, based on the writings on Herman Melville)
 The Encantadas version for narrator and chamber orchestra (1986)
 The Rain in the Trees for flute, medium or high voice, and orchestra (1993)
 Tres Sonetos de Amor for baritone and orchestra (2000, three sonnets by Pablo Neruda)
 The Rain in the Trees version for soprano and orchestra (2000)

References 

 List of works on Tobias Picker's website
 Schott Music works list

External links 
 Tobias Picker composer profile at Schott Music
 Tobias Picker's official website

Picker, Tobias